Pohlsepia mazonensis is a species of fossil organism with unknown affinity. Although it was originally identified as an extinct cephalopod, later studies denied that interpretation. The species is known from a single exceptionally preserved fossil discovered in the late Carboniferous (Pennsylvanian) Francis Creek Shale (Mazon Creek fossil beds) of the Carbondale Formation, north-east Illinois, United States.

Pohlsepia mazonensis is named after its discoverer, James Pohl, and the type locality, Mazon Creek. Its habitat was the shallows seawards of a major river delta in what at that time was an inland ocean between the Midwest and the Appalachians. In its initial description, it was considered to be the oldest known octopus, but later studies have considered this classification dubious. In 2022, it was even shown that it may not be a mollusk.

The type specimen is reposited at the Field Museum of Natural History in Chicago, Illinois.

Fossil
The Pohlsepia mazonensis fossil found by James Pohl is the only known example of the species. Most notably, the fossil has ten arms. The extra two arms are shorter, while the other eight are similar in length.

While it is unclear, one of these features could be an ink sac. The fossil lacks arm hooks and suckers and all of these factors combine to make the assigning of the order Cirroctopoda controversial.

Etymology

Genus name Pohlsepia is came from its discoverer James Pohl. He is the son of Joe Pohl and together they have collected fossils in the Mazon Creek area. Originally from Wisconsin and Minnesota, Pohl is a native Midwesterner. He and his father have donated their fossils to museums in the area, including Pohlsepia mazonensis to the Field Museum.

Classification

In 2000, Joanne Kluessendorf assigned Pohlsepia mazonensis to the order Cirroctopoda. Many other researchers disagreed, citing the lack of internal structure. The possible evidence of fins and the huge time difference between the Pohlsepia mazonensis fossil and first confirmed cirrate octopus fossils is problematic. However, the species can be classified as an octopod. Despite having ten arms, the fact that the fossil has an indistinct head, sac like body and similar fins to cirrate octopods gives enough evidence to classify Pohlsepia mazonensis in the order Cirroctopoda.

When looking at the groups Teudopsidae, Trachyteuthididae, the Vampyromorpha, cirrate octopods, incirrate octopods and the fossil Loligosepiina, the describing authors proposed Pohlsepia mazonensis would be most related to the octopods based on its lack of a shell.

However, later studies found the placement within Octopoda to be dubious, due to the fossils poor preservation, and the fact that other fossils have now shown true octopi to have first arose in the Jurassic. In 2021, it is considered that is even unlikely to be cephalopod or mollusk. Lack of a shell is a highly unlikely combination in a Carboniferous cephalopod. In addition, its appendages lack hooks, suckers, cirri, an arm web, and the characteristic 8/10 arm count. There is neither a beak, unambiguous ink sac, nor radula. The bulbous body outline and presence of appendages more likely to show the affinity as a cnidarian, a phylum of invertebrate animals including jellyfish and sea anemones.

Mazon Creek
Located in what is currently northern Illinois, the Mazon Creek preserved the Pohlsepia mazonensis fossil extraordinarily. The Pohlsepia mazonensis fossil was found specifically in the Francis Creek Shale Member and like most fossils found in Mazon Creek, is preserved as carbon film. The Francis Creek Shale Member of the Carbon Formation has a diverse array of preserved plants and animals.

These organisms were immediately buried due to bursts of water and their remains were protected before most decomposition could start. In storm surges organisms would be submerged in sediments, creating an environment where their fossils were extremely well protected.

Field Museum of Natural History

The Pohlsepia mazonensis fossil is currently located at the Field Museum of Natural History in Chicago, Illinois. Located eighty miles from the fossil's discovery, the museum is one of the largest natural history museums in the world. It also houses similar fossils in the Mazon Creek Fossil Invertebrates Exhibit. These fossils include spoon worms, ribbon worms, bristle worms, millipedes, and cockroaches.

References

External links
The Octopus News Magazine Online: Fossil Octopuses

Fossil taxa described in 2000
Controversial taxa
Species known from a single specimen